Michael Ray Jones (born April 30, 1965) is a current college basketball head coach.  Jones’ father, Jimmy, was a star guard in the ABA from 1967-74. In 1974, Jimmy Jones signed with the Washington Bullets in the NBA, where he remained until 1977.

Mike Jones spent 10 years as head men's basketball coach at Radford. During his time there, he was named Big South Conference Coach of the Year in 2018 and 2020. While at Radford, Jones coached Javonte Green, Radford's first NBA Player.  Green, who went undrafted in 2015, made his NBA debut with the Boston Celtics in 2019 and currently plays for the Chicago Bulls.

In April 2021, Jones was hired to be the head men's basketball coach at UNC Greensboro.

Head coaching record

References

1965 births
Living people
American men's basketball coaches
American men's basketball players
College men's basketball head coaches in the United States
Howard Bison men's basketball players
Howard Bison men's basketball coaches
Furman Paladins men's basketball coaches
Georgia Bulldogs basketball coaches
High school basketball coaches in the United States
Radford Highlanders men's basketball coaches
Richmond Spiders men's basketball coaches
UNC Greensboro Spartans men's basketball coaches
VCU Rams men's basketball coaches
West Virginia Mountaineers men's basketball coaches